A tensioner is a device that applies a force to create or maintain tension. The force may be applied parallel to, as in the case of a hydraulic bolt tensioner, or perpendicular to, as in the case of a spring-loaded bicycle chain tensioner, the tension it creates. The force may be generated by a fixed displacement, as in the case of an eccentric bicycle bottom bracket, which must be adjusted as parts wear, or by stretching or compressing a spring, as in the case of a spring-loaded bicycle chain tensioner; by changing the volume of a gas, as in the case of a marine riser tensioner; by hydraulic pressure, as in the case of a hydraulic bolt tensioner; or by gravity acting on a suspended mass, as in the case of a chair lift cable tensioner. In the power sector, the tensioner is a machine for maintaining constant tension of the conductors during work of hanging the transmission network..

Applications

Bolt tensioners are devices designed to apply a specific tension to a bolt. The device may be either removed once the actual nut is threaded into place or left in place, in the case of a hydraulic nut.

The belt or chain tension on a single-speed bicycle can be maintained by either setting the fixed horizontal position of the rear sprocket or the front chainring horizontally, or by a separate tensioner that pushes perpendicular to the chain with either a fixed position or spring tension.

The serpentine belt and the timing belt or chain on an automobile engine may be guided by an idler pulley and/or a belt tensioner, which may be spring-loaded, hydraulic, or fixed.

The chain tension of a chainsaw may be adjusted with a chain tensioner.

A marine riser tensioner is a device used on an offshore drilling vessel that provides a near-constant upward force on the drilling riser independent of the movement of the floating drill vessel.
A guideline tensioner is a hydropneumatic device used on an offshore drilling rig that keeps a positive pulling force on the guidelines from the platform to a template on the seabed.
Overhead electrical wires may be kept in tension by springs or weights.
Conveyor belts
Chair lift and gondola lift cables
Certain wood trusses, such as the beam tensioner truss picture below.

Fencing made of wire, such as electric fences, barbed-wire fences, and chainlink fences often include tensioning devices to keep them taut.
Belt sanders have a mechanism, often a spring-loaded idler drum, to apply the proper tension to the sanding belt, which can be released to allow for changing belts.

Gallery

See also
Turnbuckle
Torque wrench

References

External links
 Hydraulic Tensioning Glossary
Hydraulic Puller-tensioner 

Drilling technology
Hardware (mechanical)